Charles M. Snow (August 3, 1849 – August 27, 1929), was a professional baseball player who played catcher for the 1874 Brooklyn Atlantics.

References

External links

1849 births
1929 deaths
Brooklyn Atlantics players
Major League Baseball catchers
19th-century baseball players
Baseball players from Massachusetts
Burials at Green-Wood Cemetery